Pleven TV tower (best known as Miziya Tower) is a telecommunication tower in Pleven, Bulgaria. It is located east of the Druzhba quarter of the city. The tower was opened in the 1960s; with height of 107 meters it is the tallest building in the city.

See also 
 List of tallest structures in Bulgaria

References
РРТС Плевен - кв. Дружба
 

Towers in Bulgaria
Buildings and structures in Pleven
1960s establishments in Bulgaria